Arthur John Caldwell (24 February 1913 – 26 July 1989) was an English footballer. A left winger noted for his pace, he played for Manchester United, Winsford United and Port Vale in the 1930s.

Career
Caldwell played for Manchester United, (without making any first-team appearances) and Winsford United, and after a trial at Aston Villa joined Port Vale in May 1935. He played one Second Division game for the club in the 1934–35 season. He scored ten goals in 42 games in the 1935–36 season, the first one of note being against former employers Manchester United at Old Trafford in a 7–2 defeat. He also scored the equalizer in a 2–2 draw with top-flight Sunderland at Roker Park that earned the "Valiants" a replay in the Third Round of the FA Cup. However, he was limited to just 13 Third Division North games in the 1936–37 season, scoring two goals, as he was struck down with injury. He recovered to score ten goals in 35 league games in the 1937–38, including a hat-trick in a 5–1 win over Hartlepools United at The Old Recreation Ground on 9 October. However, he featured just four times in the Third Division South in the 1938–39 season, and left the club as World War II approached.

Career statistics
Source:

References

Footballers from Salford
English footballers
Association football wingers
Manchester United F.C. players
Winsford United F.C. players
Port Vale F.C. players
English Football League players
1913 births
1989 deaths